Jean Douvinet (7 June 1899 – 3 August 1987) was a French wrestler. He competed in the Greco-Roman light heavyweight at the 1920 Summer Olympics.

References

External links
 

1899 births
1987 deaths
Olympic wrestlers of France
Wrestlers at the 1920 Summer Olympics
French male sport wrestlers
Place of birth missing